The Wonderful World of Disney: Disneyland 60 was a television special celebrating the 60th anniversary of the Disneyland theme park in Anaheim, California, which aired February 21, 2016. The special was largely broadcast from the Hollywood and Highland Center. It is the second episode of the re-incarnation of The Wonderful World of Disney (originally aired from 1954 to 2008), after returning as an infrequent series of specials in 2015.

The show was introduced by Dancing with the Stars performers Derek Hough and Witney Carson.

The trailer for Pete's Dragon debuted during the special.

Segments
 Opening sequence, featuring Dancing With The Stars pro dancers and Pentatonix performing a special version of "Be Our Guest".
 Dance themed clip reel, set to the song "Rapper's Delight" by The Sugarhill Gang, introduced by Witney Carson and Alfonso Ribeiro
 Mickey Mouse tribute, introduced by Bryce Dallas Howard
 Dance sequences, introduced by Carson and Ribeiro
 "Part of Your World", featuring Kelsea Ballerini, dancers included Maddie Ziegler
 "I Wan'na Be Like You", featuring Fall Out Boy
 "Friend Like Me", featuring Ne-Yo
 "Step in Time", featuring Derek Hough and including an appearance by Dick van Dyke
 "Circle of Life", performed by Elton John at Sleeping Beauty Castle
 "Let It Go", performed by Idina Menzel at Disney California Adventure's Paradise Pier
 Harrison Ford, talking about the moviegoing experience, his involvement in the Star Wars films, and Star Wars Land
 Star Wars: In Concert, introduced by Ford, and including a cameo by BB-8
 Tori Kelly and Kermit the Frog performing "The Rainbow Connection".
 "Steve McQueen" performed by Little Big Town in Cars Land, introduced by Hough
 Segment on recent Disneyland additions, hosted by Whoopi Goldberg
 Zootopia clip introduced by Ginnifer Goodwin and Jason Bateman
 Segment on Disney animation, stories and characters, hosted by John Lasseter, introduced by Goodwin and Bateman
 "The Sorcerer's Apprentice", performed by the Los Angeles Philharmonic at the Walt Disney Concert Hall, accompanied with footage of The Sorcerer's Apprentice segment of Fantasia, introduced by Kiefer Sutherland
 A segment on Shanghai Disney Resort, introduced and narrated by Priyanka Chopra
 "Wonderful Crazy Night", performed by Elton John at Sleeping Beauty Castle, introduced by Derek Hough

Disney Short Films Clips
 Steamboat Willie (1928)
 Plane Crazy (1929)
 Lonesome Ghosts (1937)
 Mickey's Trailer (1938)

Disney Films Clips
 Snow White and the Seven Dwarfs (1937)
 Pinocchio (1940)
 Fantasia (1940)
 Dumbo (1941)
 Bambi (1942)
 Cinderella (1950)
 Alice in Wonderland (1951)
 Peter Pan (1953)
 Lady and the Tramp (1955)
 Sleeping Beauty (1959)
 One Hundred and One Dalmatians (1961)
 The Sword in the Stone (1963)
 Mary Poppins (1964)
 The Jungle Book (1967)
 The Aristocats (1970)
 Bedknobs and Broomsticks (1971)
 Robin Hood (1973)
 The Many Adventures of Winnie the Pooh (1977)
 The Little Mermaid (1989)
 Beauty and the Beast (1991)
 Aladdin (1992)
 The Lion King (1994)
 Pocahontas (1995)
 Toy Story (1995)
 The Hunchback of Notre Dame (1996)
 Hercules (1997)
 Mulan (1998)
 Tarzan (1999)
 Toy Story 2 (1999)
 Monsters, Inc. (2001)
 Lilo & Stitch (2002)
 Finding Nemo (2003)
 The Incredibles (2004)
 Cars (2006)
 Ratatouille (2007)
 WALL-E (2008)
 Up (2009)
 The Princess and the Frog (2009)
 Tangled (2010)
 Winnie the Pooh (2011)
 The Muppets (2011)
 Brave (2012)
 Wreck-It Ralph (2012)
 Monsters University (2013)
 Frozen (2013)
 Muppets Most Wanted (2014)
 Big Hero 6 (2014)
 Inside Out (2015)

Star Wars films Clips
 Star Wars (1977)
 The Empire Strikes Back (1980)
 Star Wars: Episode II Attack of the Clones (2002)
 Star Wars: Episode III Revenge of the Sith (2005)
 Star Wars: The Force Awakens (2015)

Upcoming Disney Films Clips
 Zootopia (2016)
 The Jungle Book (2016)
 Finding Dory (2016)
 Pete's Dragon (2016)

Production
The special was produced by Den of Thieves & Lincoln Square Productions.
 Executive producers: Jesse Ignatovic, Evan Prager
 Director: Louis J. Horvitz
 Disneyland Resorts segments director: Sandra Restrepo Considini

References

2010s American television specials
2016 American television episodes
2016 television specials
2016 in American television
Disneyland 60
Television shows directed by Louis J. Horvitz